Tennessee Valley Railroad No. 610 is a coal-burning S160 Class 2-8-0 "Consolidation" type steam locomotive built by the Baldwin-Lima-Hamilton Corporation for the U.S. Army in March 1952. It is one of the last steam locomotives built for service in the United States and the last new steam locomotive acquired by the U.S. Army. As of 2021, No. 610 is out of service awaiting a major overhaul and whether or not it will run again is still yet to be determined.

History
No. 610 was one of eight steam locomotives for use on the Army railroad and was used to train soldiers in railroad operation in maintenance. It also was used for transport on the 31-mile long Fort Eustis Military Railroad to an interchange with the U.S. railroad at a junction in at Lee Hall, Virginia.

When the Fort Eustis Military Railroad decommissioned steam operations in 1972, No. 610 was obtained by the Wiregrass Heritage Chapter of the National Railway Historical Society in Dothan, Alabama. In 1978, it was donated to the Tennessee Valley Railroad Museum were it was placed into storage for nine years. In 1987, it was pulled from storage were restoration to return it back to operation officially began. The restoration lasted for three years until 1990 when it returned to service for the first time in eighteen years, it noticeably changed its cosmetic appearance, it was allowed by the Norfolk Southern to operate on their trackage as part of their steam program. No. 610 served as pulling power on the TVRM's excursions until it was taken out of service for its Federal Railroad Administration (FRA) mandated 1,472-day inspection in December 2010. 

In 2018, following the completion of the restoration of Southern Railway 630 in 2011 and Southern Railway 4501 in 2014, No. 610 was moved to the facilities' Soule Shops, where it currently awaits a major overhaul, although the restoration progress has currently been put on hold until further notice.

See also 
 Great Smoky Mountains Railroad 1702

References

External links
US Army 610 Steam Engine

Steam locomotives of the United States
USATC S160 Class
2-8-0 locomotives
Individual locomotives of the United States
United States Army locomotives
Standard gauge locomotives of the United States
Railway locomotives introduced in 1952
Baldwin locomotives

Preserved steam locomotives of Tennessee